Trevor Read (born December 1, 1980 in Calgary, Alberta) is a Canadian ice hockey defenceman currently playing for the Rapaces de Gap in France.

Career 
Read began his professional hockey career in 2002 with the ECHL's Toledo Storm. He also played in the ECHL for the Peoria Rivermen and the Long Beach Ice Dogs. Read then moved to the Central Hockey League for a brief spell with the Austin Ice Bats before spending two and a half years with the Amarillo Gorillas. He moved to the UK in 2008, signing with the Basingstoke Bison and left on 30 September 2009 United Kingdom to sign for French team Rapaces de Gap.

External links

1980 births
Living people
Amarillo Gorillas players
Austin Ice Bats players
Basingstoke Bison players
Canadian ice hockey defencemen
Fort Saskatchewan Traders players
Long Beach Ice Dogs (ECHL) players
Peoria Rivermen (ECHL) players
Rapaces de Gap players
Ice hockey people from Calgary
Toledo Storm players
Canadian expatriate ice hockey players in England
Canadian expatriate ice hockey players in France